Nir Zidkyahu (born November 1967 in Jerusalem, Israel), also known as Nir Z, is an Israeli studio-session drummer, and the brother of Blackfield's drummer Tomer Z. He played the drums for eight songs on Genesis' 1997 album, Calling All Stations, and subsequently joined the band for their 1998 tour.

In 2001, he drummed on John Mayer's breakthrough album, Room for Squares. Since then, he has played drums and percussion for various artists including Jason Mraz, Joss Stone, Ray Wilson and Alana Davis. In 2003, he recorded with Flaw on their Endangered Species record and with Chris Cornell on his second solo album, Carry On, released 2007. Zidkyahu played on several songs of the comeback album, Skyscraper, for former Journey singer Steve Augeri's original band Tall Stories, released January 23, 2009. In 2009, Zidkyahu went on tour drumming for Billy Squier.

Zidkyahu was hired by Toontrack to record the drum samples for their virtual drummer programs Superior Drummer 2.0, New York Studios Vol.2 SDX, and New York Studios Vol.3 SDX.

References

External links

1967 births
Living people
Israeli drummers
Israeli Jews
Israeli musicians
People from Rishon LeZion